"Welcome to the Cheap Seats" is a song by British alternative rock band the Wonder Stuff from their third album, Never Loved Elvis (1991). The song features backing vocals by Kirsty MacColl and was released as part of the Welcome to the Cheap Seats EP in 1992, peaking at number eight on the UK Singles Chart. The EP's cover of the country standard "Will the Circle Be Unbroken", recorded during a jam session with Canadian rock group Spirit of the West, was also a popular radio single in Canada.

Track listings
CD1, 7-inch, and 12-inch EP
 "Welcome to the Cheap Seats"
 "Me, My Mom, My Dad and My Brother"
 "Will the Circle Be Unbroken" (with Spirit of the West)
 "That's Entertainment"

CD2 EP
 "Welcome to the Cheap Seats" (Naked mix)
 "Caught in My Shadow" (Bare mix)
 "Circlesquare" (Butt Naked mix)
 "Can't Shape Up, Again"

Charts

References

External links

1991 songs
1992 EPs
1992 singles
Polydor Records EPs
Polydor Records singles
Song recordings produced by Mick Glossop